Lake Carlton is a reservoir in the Morrison-Rockwood State Park in Whiteside County in northern Illinois.

The lake is managed for sport fishing, including largemouth and rock bass, black crappie, channel catfish, redear sunfish, bluegill, muskie and walleye.

References

Protected areas of Whiteside County, Illinois
Carlton
Bodies of water of Whiteside County, Illinois